The Lower Lake Schoolhouse Museum is a local history museum located in Lower Lake, California.

History
Built in 1877, the building served as a schoolhouse until 1935 when it was sold to the local Masonic lodge. In 1993, the building was restored and the first floor was opened as a museum.

References

External links
 Lower Lake Schoolhouse Museum

Museums in Lake County, California
History museums in California
Lower Lake, California